Neogalumna seniczaki is a species of mite first found in sandy soil in a dipterocarp forest of Cát Tiên National Park.

References

Further reading

Ermilov, Sergey G., and Alexander E. Anichkin. "A new species of Ramuselloppia (Acari: Oribatida: Oppiidae) from Vietnam." Persian Journal of Acarology 2.1 (2013).
Ermilov, Sergey G., and Alexander E. Anichkin. "Oribatid mites (Acari: Oribatida) from acacia and pine plantations in southern Vietnam, with description of a new species of the subgenus Galumna (Cosmogalumna)."Systematic and Applied Acarology 18.1 (2013): 80–88.

Sarcoptiformes
Invertebrates of Vietnam